Playa Hermosa, located in the Guanacaste province of Costa Rica, is a popular beach and beach-front resort town.

People who visit Playa Hermosa can indulge in swimming, snorkeling or scuba diving, sport fishing or sailing.

Playa Hermosa, Guanacaste Province is not to be confused with Playa Hermosa, Puntarenas Province. That Playa Hermosa is a popular surfing destination.

Playa Hermosa is a popular retirement spot for North Americans.

References

Populated places in Guanacaste Province
Beaches of Costa Rica